The River in Reverse is a 2006 collaboration between Elvis Costello and Allen Toussaint. It received a Grammy nomination for Best Pop Vocal Album.

Track listing
All songs written by Allen Toussaint unless otherwise indicated.

"On Your Way Down" – 4:54
"Nearer to You" – 3:32
"Tears, Tears and More Tears" – 3:30
"The Sharpest Thorn" (Elvis Costello, Toussaint) – 4:16
"Who’s Gonna Help Brother Get Further?" – 5:04
"The River in Reverse" (Costello) – 4:32
"Freedom for the Stallion" – 2:58
"Broken Promise Land" (Costello, Toussaint) – 4:34
"Ascension Day" (Roy "Professor Longhair" Byrd, Costello, Toussaint) – 2:57
"International Echo" (Costello, Toussaint) – 4:58
"All These Things" – 4:07
"Wonder Woman" – 3:08
"Six-Fingered Man" (Costello, Toussaint) – 4:31
"The Greatest Love" – 3:47 (Japanese CD bonus track) 
"Where Is the Love" (Costello, Toussaint) – 3:54 (iTunes bonus track)

Personnel
Elvis Costello – acoustic and electric guitars, Hammond organ, tambourine, vocals, tremolo
Allen Toussaint – electric piano, vocals and backing vocals, horn arrangements
Sam Williams – trombone
Carl Blouin – baritone saxophone
Amadee Castenell – soprano saxophone, tenor saxophone
Brian Cayolle – baritone saxophone
Anthony "AB" Brown – guitar
Davey Faragher – bass guitar, backing vocals
Steve Nieve – piano, Hammond organ, clavinet, farfisa organ
Pete Thomas – drums, percussion
Joe Henry – producer

Charts

References

External links
 

Elvis Costello albums
Allen Toussaint albums
2006 albums
Albums produced by Allen Toussaint